Jon Anders Ekborg (born 9 October 1960) is a Swedish actor and singer who has performed the roles of Karl Oskar in Kristina från Duvemåla and Freddie Trumper in Chess, two musicals that were written by former ABBA members Benny Andersson and Björn Ulvaeus. He has also acted in many Swedish-language versions of musicals, such as Jekyll and Hyde, Evita and Jesus Christ Superstar. He has been married to the actress Lia Boysen.

Ekborg also toured extensively throughout Sweden, mostly accompanied by Bengt Magnusson and Anders Lundqvist. He has released one album in his own name; Äkta Vara (2006). Additionally, he has appeared in numerous gala concerts including Rhapsody in Rock.

In 2007 he appeared in two huge arena shows; Queen - Another kind of magic and The Christmas Show. In 2008 he performed the role of Warrior in London - the Musical, and 14 July he took part in the birthday celebration of the Swedish Crown Princess Victoria.

In 2009 Ekborg did The Special Tour with Noel McCalla and Caroline Larsson. He also did a Christmas Tour on his own.

On 6 February 2010 Ekborg participated in Melodi Grand Prix; Melodifestivalen, in the 1st race in Örnsköldsvik, with the song "The Saviour", written by Tony Nilsson and Henrik Janson. The song was described as "magnificent but difficult to sing" and it was the first time Ekborg took part in the competition. The song finished in sixth place in the race, which was not sufficient to proceed.

Selected discography

Albums
(Peak positions on Swedish Albums Chart)
1996: Kristina från Duvemåla: Den kompletta utgåvan - musical - (#2)
1999: Sexton favoriter ur Kristina från Duvemåla (#22)
2001: Evita
2002: Chess på Svenska - musical - (#2)
2006: Äkta vara (#27)
2010: Painted Dreams (#16)
2011: En stilla jul (#20)

Singles
2010: "The Saviour (Il Salvatore)"
2010: "I Do Believe"
2010: "Painted Dreams"

Selected filmography
1993 - Murder at the Savoy
1993 - Drömkåken
1994 - Illusioner
1998 - The Last Contract
1999 - Dödsklockan
1999 - Tomten är far till alla barnen
1999 - Prinsen av Egypten
2001 - Syndare i sommarsol
2003 - Chess på svenska
2004 - Falla vackert
2004 - Drowning Ghost
2005 - Wallander - Byfånen
2006 - Den som viskar
2006 - Snapphanar
2009 - Kommissarien och havet
2013 - Crimes of Passion

References

External links 
Official website
Anders Ekborg - sångare och skådespelare, official fan club website
Official Facebook page

1960 births
Living people
Swedish male singers
English-language singers from Sweden
Singers from Stockholm
Male actors from Stockholm
Melodifestivalen contestants of 2010